Samuel Piètre  (born 10 February 1984, in Villeneuve-Saint-Georges) is a French football player. Currently, he plays in the Championnat National 2 for AS Poissy.

He played for the main squad of Paris Saint-Germain F.C. in Coupe de France and UEFA Cup.

He was part of the 18-man squad for the youth France national team that won the FIFA U-17 World Cup in 2001.

External links

footballplus

1984 births
Living people
Sportspeople from Villeneuve-Saint-Georges
French footballers
Footballers from Réunion
Paris Saint-Germain F.C. players
FC Istres players
Ligue 2 players
Levadiakos F.C. players
US Créteil-Lusitanos players
AS Poissy players
France youth international footballers
Association football midfielders
Footballers from Val-de-Marne